Many musical terms are in Italian because, in Europe, the vast majority of the most important early composers from the Renaissance to the Baroque period were Italian. That period is when numerous musical indications were used extensively for the first time.

Italian terms and English translations

Musical instruments

Voices

Tempo

Dynamics – volume

Moods

Musical expression (general)

Patterns within the musical score

Directions

Techniques

Roles

Criticism

Musical direction and staging

See also 
 Musical terminology
 Sheet music

References

External links 
8notes glossary

Italian
Musical
Music
Italian
Wikipedia glossaries using tables